The Wingate Commercial Historic District is a national historic district located at Wingate, Union County, North Carolina.  It encompasses four contributing buildings in the central business district of Wingate.  The district developed between about 1904 and 1925 and the one-story, brick commercial buildings are the State Bank of Wingate (c. 1909), Wingate Drug Company Store (c. 1910), J. L. Austin Company Store (c. 1904), and Katie Lee Austin Store (1925).

It was listed on the National Register of Historic Places in 2014.

References

Commercial buildings on the National Register of Historic Places in North Carolina
Historic districts on the National Register of Historic Places in North Carolina
Geography of Union County, North Carolina
Buildings and structures in Union County, North Carolina
National Register of Historic Places in Union County, North Carolina